Streptomyces coeruleofuscus is a bacterium species from the genus of Streptomyces which has been isolated from soil in Daghestan.

See also 
 List of Streptomyces species

References

Further reading

External links
Type strain of Streptomyces coeruleofuscus at BacDive -  the Bacterial Diversity Metadatabase

coeruleofuscus
Bacteria described in 1986